The Drydene 200 was a NASCAR Xfinity Series race that took place at Dover International Speedway. It was the second Xfinity Series race each year at Dover. The race usually took place in late September or early October before being moved to August in 2020. It is held before the Drydene 400, the NASCAR Cup Series race. It was the third race for the NASCAR Xfinity Series playoffs prior to 2020.

In the 2001 edition of the race Martin Truex Jr. made his NASCAR national series debut.

Chase Briscoe is the final winner of the event, having won it in 2020.

The 2020 race was held as a doubleheader in August due to the COVID-19 pandemic. Run on August 23, it took place the day after the rescheduled spring race also named the Drydene 200. Dover downscaled to one race in 2021.

Past winners

2006 & 2008: Race extended due to a green–white–checker finish.
2016: Race postponed from Saturday to Sunday due to rain.
2020: Race moved from Saturday to Sunday due to schedule changes resulting from the COVID-19 pandemic.

Multiple winners (drivers)

Multiple winners (teams)

Manufacturer wins

References

External links
 

1986 establishments in Delaware
Former NASCAR races
NASCAR Xfinity Series races
 
Recurring sporting events established in 1986
Recurring sporting events disestablished in 2020
Annual sporting events in the United States